Alsėdžiai (Samogitian: Alsiedē) is a small town in the Plungė district municipality. It is near the Sruoja River,  from Plungė.

Alsėdžiai is an administrative center of the Alsėdžiai eldership. Stanisław Narutowicz, one of the signers of Act of Independence of Lithuania and brother to the first president of Poland Gabriel Narutowicz is buried in the village cemetery.

As of 2011, there were 896 inhabitants living in this town.

History
A settlement of Baltic tribes in the territory of the present-day city is said to have existed in the region as early as Mesolithic times.

In June 1941, Jews from the town are kept prisoners in a ghetto, some are killed and some are used as labor slaves.
On December 24, 1941, 24-27 Jewish women and one boy were killed in a mass execution perpetrated by an Einsatzgruppen. The murderers selected a place by the foot of the hill by the cemetery so the victims couldn’t escape.

References

External links

 Short info about Alsėdžiai

Towns in Lithuania
Towns in Telšiai County
Plungė District Municipality
Telshevsky Uyezd
Holocaust locations in Lithuania